This is the list of the Catholic dioceses and archdioceses of the United States which includes both the dioceses of the Latin Church, which employ the Roman Rite and other Latin liturgical rites, and various other dioceses, primarily the eparchies of the Eastern Catholic Churches, which employ various Eastern Christian rites and traditions, and which are in full communion with the Pope in Rome. The Archdiocese for the Military Services, USA is not a metropolitan diocese. The Personal Ordinariate of the Chair of Saint Peter was established on January 1, 2012 for former Anglicans who join the Catholic Church.

The Catholic Church in the United States has a total of 196 particular churches in the 50 U.S. states, Washington D.C., and the U.S. Virgin Islands: 32 territorial archdioceses, 144 territorial dioceses, the Archdiocese for the Military Services, USA (serving members of the US Armed Forces and Diplomatic Corps, and those in facilities of the Veterans Administration and their dependents), and the Personal Ordinariate of the Chair of Saint Peter (serving Catholics who were formerly Anglicans) within the Latin Church; and two archeparchies and 16 eparchies in the Eastern Catholic Churches.

There are several other dioceses whose territories cover the Nation's unincorporated territories.  Puerto Rico has one ecclesiastical province comprising an archdiocese and five dioceses, which together form the Puerto Rican Episcopal Conference, which is separate from the United States Conference of Catholic Bishops. The dioceses that encompass American Samoa, the Northern Mariana Islands, and Guam are part of the Episcopal Conference of the Pacific.

Terminology 
The pastor of any particular church other than an ordinariate must be episcopally ordained, but his title conforms to that of his jurisdiction: the pastor of an archdiocese is an archbishop, the pastor of a diocese is a bishop, the pastor of an archeparchy is an archeparch, the pastor of an eparchy is an eparch, and the pastor of an exarchate is an exarch. The pastor of each particular church is, ex officio, a full member of the United States Conference of Catholic Bishops (USCCB). Auxiliary and retired bishops are also members of the Conference but have no vote.

In the United States, each archbishop is also the metropolitan bishop of an ecclesiastical province that encompasses several adjacent dioceses. Likewise, each archeparch is also the metropolitan of an ecclesiastical province that encompasses all of the eparchies of the same sui iuris particular church in the United States.  Most provincial and diocesan boundaries conform to state, county, borough (in Alaska), or  parish (in Louisiana) political boundaries.  The sui iuris Ukrainian Greek Catholic Church in the US has an ecclesiastical province consisting of an archeparchy and three eparchies, and the sui iuris Ruthenian Greek Catholic Church has an ecclesiastical province consisting of an archeparchy and three eparchies; the boundaries of these jurisdictions also generally conform to those of states.  Most of the remaining eparchies are national in territory, but two particular churches, namely the Armenian Catholic Eparchy of Our Lady of Nareg and the Personal Ordinariate of the Chair of Saint Peter, are international, encompassing all of the United States and Canada; their pastors also are ex officio members of the Canadian Conference of Catholic Bishops (CCCB).

In the Roman Rite, (arch)dioceses customarily take the name of the city of the (arch)bishop's cathedra, denominated the "see". A few dioceses bear the names of two cities, variously reflecting a shift in the major center of population, e.g., the Archdiocese of Galveston-Houston; future plan to divide a diocese, e.g., the former Diocese of Reno-Las Vegas; union of two former dioceses, e.g., the Diocese of Kansas City-St. Joseph; political expedience, e.g., the Archdiocese of St. Paul and Minneapolis; or a perceived need for some episcopal functions to be accessible to residents of another part of the diocesan territory, e.g., the Diocese of Altoona-Johnstown. Some of the sui iuris particular churches also follow this custom, while others denominated their jurisdictions after saints or other religious titles.

In the Catholic Church, there are many bishops who do not govern dioceses:

 A "coadjutor" is appointed to assist the bishop of a diocese or eparchy with its daily governance and has the right of automatic succession upon the death or resignation of the bishop.  A coadjutor always holds the title "Coadjutor of [name of see]". The coadjutor of an archdiocese or archeparchy also has the status of an archbishop or archeparch.
 A retired diocesan bishop holds the title of "Bishop Emeritus of [name of see]" or, in the case of an archdiocese, "Archbishop Emeritus of [name of see]".
 Auxiliary bishops, bishops who govern jurisdictions that are not canonically erected as dioceses, bishops and archbishops of the Roman Curia, and bishops and archbishops of the diplomatic corps of the Holy See have titles of former dioceses and archdioceses.
 The Pope also may confer the personal title of "archbishop" on a diocesan bishop who does not govern an archdiocese; such a prelate is classified as an archbishop ad personam: although still merely a diocesan bishop, he is titled with the name of a former archdiocese in addition to possessing the title of his own diocese. Archbishop Fulton J. Sheen, Bishop of Rochester and Titular Archbishop of Neoportus was one of the more famous examples of this custom.

When a diocese is suppressed or when the diocesan see is transferred to another location, the title of the former see becomes available for assignment to a titular bishop or, in the case of an archdiocese, a titular archbishop or an archbishop ad personam. The Vatican resurrected the names of many former sees of the United States in the 1990s, as indicated by the table of former dioceses toward the end of this article.

Territorial provinces and dioceses 
 
United States Episcopal Conference

Puerto Rican Episcopal Conference

Episcopal Conference of the Pacific

Military archdiocese 
Members of the Armed Forces of the United States and their dependents, employees of the US Veterans Health Administration and its patients, and Americans in civil service overseas, including the Nation's diplomatic corps and their dependents, both Catholics of the Latin Church and Eastern Churches, are served by the Archdiocese for the Military Services, USA. An archbishop leads it who is presently assisted by four auxiliary bishops. Its status as an "archdiocese" is merely honorary. In 1986, Pope John Paul II amended the juridical organization of military chaplaincies from "military vicariates" to "military ordinariates", the head of which was likened to a diocesan bishop. The Ordinary of the Archdiocese of the Military Services is usually granted the personal title of "Archbishop", although this is not a requisite of the office.

Eastern Catholic eparchies 

Province of Philadelphia (Ukrainian)

The Ukrainian Greek Catholic Church in the United States is organized into a metropolia (province) comprising a metropolitan archeparchy and three suffragan eparchies.

Province of Pittsburgh (Ruthenian)

The Ruthenian Greek Catholic Church in the United States is organized into the sui iuris Province of Pittsburgh, consisting of a metropolitan archeparchy and three suffragan eparchies. The eparchies also serve the faithful of other Byzantine Catholic Churches without established hierarchies in the United States, namely those of the Albanian, Belarusian, Bulgarian, Croatian, Greek, Hungarian, Italo-Albanian, Macedonian, Russian, and Slovakian Byzantine Catholic Churches. Since 2022, this province includes also the Slovakian Catholic Exarchate of Saints Cyril and Methodius of Toronto in Canada, which was formerly part of the Slovakian Greek Catholic Church.

Eastern Catholic eparchies in the United States immediately subject to the Holy See

The following particular Eastern Catholic Churches are not suffragan to metropolitan sees, but are instead exempt and therefore immediately subject to the Holy See, while they still remain part of their respective patriarchal, major archiepiscopal, or other rite- and tradition-specific particular churches.

Eastern Catholic eparchies comprising the United States and Canada, and immediately subject to the Holy See

Several Eastern Catholic Churches have jurisdictions that include members and congregations in both the United States and Canada.

Personal ordinariate (Anglican Use) 
Under the provisions of Anglicanorum Coetibus of 2009, an effort was underway to establish a personal ordinariate, or diocese, in the United States. The ordinariate was formed for former Anglicans, including members from the Episcopal Church, Continuing Anglican churches, and already Catholic Anglican Use parishes. The first such ordinariate established was the Personal Ordinariate of Our Lady of Walsingham in the United Kingdom. The personal ordinariate encompassing the whole United States, the Personal Ordinariate of the Chair of Saint Peter, was instituted on January 1, 2012 in accordance with Anglicanorum Coetibus. It was later expanded to include Canada, and so its ordinary is admitted to the two countries' bishops' conferences.

Former US dioceses

See also 
Provincial boundaries in the United States
List of Roman Catholic bishops of the United States
List of Roman Catholic dioceses (structured view)
List of Roman Catholic dioceses (alphabetical)
List of the Roman Catholic cathedrals of the United States

Nunciature to the United States

List of Catholic archdioceses (by continent and nation)
List of Catholic titular sees

References

External links 
 United States Conference of Catholic Bishops: List of Dioceses
 GCatholic

 
United States
Catholic dioceses